Chah Faleh may refer to:
 Chah Faleh-ye Gharbi
 Chah Faleh-ye Sharqi